I-185 (originally I-85) was an Imperial Japanese Navy Kaidai type cruiser submarine of the KD7 sub-class commissioned in 1943. During World War II, she served in the Central and Southwest Pacific Ocean before she was sunk with all hands by an American destroyer in June 1944.

Design and description
The submarines of the KD7 sub-class were medium-range attack submarines developed from the preceding KD6 sub-class. They displaced  surfaced and  submerged.

For surface running, the submarines were powered by two  diesel engines, each driving one propeller shaft. When submerged, each propeller was driven by a  electric motor. They could reach  on the surface and  submerged.

The submarines were armed with six internal  torpedo tubes, all in the bow. They carried one reload for each tube, for a total of 12 torpedoes. They were originally intended to be armed with two twin-gun mounts for the  Type 96 anti-aircraft gun, but a  deck gun for combat on the surface was substituted for one 25 mm mount during construction.

Construction and commissioning
I-185 was laid down at the Yokosuka Naval Arsenal in Yokosuka, Japan, as Submarine No. 163 on 9 February 1942. She soon was named I-85, and she was renamed I-185 on 20 May 1942. She was launched on 16 September 1942 and completed and commissioned on 23 September 1943.

Service history

September 1943–January 1944
On the day of her commissioning, I-185 was attached to the Sasebo Naval District and assigned to Submarine Squadron 11 in the 1st Fleet, an element of the Combined Fleet, for workups. Submarine Squadron 11 was reassigned to the 6th Fleet, another element of the Combined Fleet, on 25 November 1943.

I-185 arrived at Sasebo, Japan, on 2 December 1943.

I-185 departed Sasebo on 5 January 1944 bound for Truk Atoll in the Caroline Islands, which she reached early on the morning of 12 January 1944, entering Truk Lagoon via North Pass.

Southwest Pacific

On 22 January 1944, I-185 was reassigned to the Southeast Area Fleet. She took aboard stores from the auxiliary submarine tender  on 23 January 1944 and got underway from Truk on 25 January bound for Rabaul on New Britain in the Bismarck Archipelago, but a mechanical failure forced her to return to Truk the same day. After repairs, she got back underway on 27 January 1944 and arrived at Rabaul on 31 January 1944.

On the day I-185 arrived at Rabaul, preliminary actions preceding the Battle of the Green Islands began when a 360-man Allied raiding force landed on Nissan Island in the Green Islands. The commander of the Southeast Area Fleet, Vice Admiral Gunichi Mikawa, immediately ordered I-185 and the submarine  to take aboard the Wada Detachment — a 123-man naval infantry force — to reinforce the Japanese garrison on Nissan.  immediately began to embark 77 of the naval infantrymen and load food and ammunition for the Japanese forces on Nissan.

I-185 and I-169 departed Rabaul on 1 February 1944 and headed for Nissan. The submarines arrived at Nissan at 05:00 on 3 February 1944, but heavy seas prevented them from disembarking all of the naval infantrymen. After disembarking 77 men between them, they headed back to Rabaul with a combined 46 naval infantry personnel still aboard. I-185 arrived at Rabaul on 4 February 1944.

At 12:00 on 12 February 1944, I-185 departed Rabaul to carry supplies to Japanese forces at the Iboki Plantation on New Britain. She arrived at the plantation on 13 February 1944, unloaded her cargo, and immediately headed back to Rabaul, where she arrived on 16 February 1944.

I-185 set out from Rabaul on 24 February 1944 on another supply run, this time bound for Buka Island in the northwestern Solomon Islands. While at sea, she received orders on 28 February 1944 to abort her supply run and search for a United States Navy task force reported to be in the vicinity. She encountered no American ships and returned to Rabaul on 1 March 1944.

On 4 March 1944, I-185 again got underway from Rabaul to transport supplies to Buka Island. While she was on the surface east of New Ireland recharging her batteries on 5 March 1944, an Allied bomber — probably a Lockheed Ventura of the Royal New Zealand Air Force′s No. 2 Squadron — attacked her, scoring near-misses which knocked out her gyrocompass and caused a serious fuel leak that contaminated a quarter of her battery cells. The damage prompted I-185 to abort her supply run and turn back toward Rabaul. During her return voyage a fire broke out in her battery compartment on 10 March 1944, and when she contacted Rabaul that day, she received orders to make for Truk rather than Rabaul because of a recent Allied air raid on Rabaul. She arrived at Truk on 17 March 1944 and began emergency repairs.

I-185 departed Truk on 22 March 1944 to head for Japan, but a malfunctioning gyrocompass forced her to put back into port at Truk for repairs. She again got underway on 23 March 1944 bound for Sasebo, which she reached on 31 March 1944. She underwent repairs at Sasebo.

Central Pacific

With her repairs complete, I-185 departed Kure on 11 June 1944 on a supply run to Wewak, New Guinea, her decks piled high with drums of rice intended for Japanese forces fighting in the New Guinea campaign. Heavy seas washed most of the drums overboard.

On 13 June 1944, amid indications of an imminent American invasion of the Mariana Islands, the commander-in-chief of the Combined Fleet, Admiral Soemu Toyoda, activated Operation A-Go for the defense of the Marianas. The same day, the commander of the 6th Fleet, Vice Admiral Takeo Takagi, ordered all available submarines under his command to deploy in the central Pacific Ocean east of Marianas as part of the defense. The Marianas campaign began with American amphibious landings on Saipan on 15 June 1944. With the Battle of Saipan underway, Takagi's ability to command the 6th Fleet from the fleet's headquarters on Saipan was disrupted, and command of the fleet passed to the commander of Submarine Squadron 7, Rear Admiral Noboru Owada at Truk Atoll in the Caroline Islands. I-185 transmitted her last routine situation report at 22:30 Japan Standard Time on 15 June 1944.

The Battle of the Philippine Sea which folllowed on 19–20 June 1944 resulted in a major defeat of Japanese naval forces.

Loss

At 09:03 on 22 June 1944, the U.S. Navy destroyer  — serving as flagship of the screen of a convoy of troop transports bound for Saipan — gained sonar contact on I-185. She conducted a depth-charge attack, then lost contact. The fast minesweeper  joined the action and made a depth-charge attack at 10:23 which resulted in oil coming to the surface. It marked the destruction of I-185.

Later on 22 June 1944, Owada ordered I-185 and all but six of the other Japanese submarines in the Marianas area to withdraw from the Marianas, but I-185 did not acknowledge the order. On 12 July 1944, the Imperial Japanese Navy declared I-185 to be presumed lost with all 95 hands in the vicinity of Saipan. The Japanese struck I-185 from the Navy List on 10 September 1944.

Notes

References
 
 
 
 

1942 ships
Ships built by Yokosuka Naval Arsenal
Kaidai-class submarines
World War II submarines of Japan
Ship fires
Maritime incidents in March 1944
Maritime incidents in June 1944
World War II shipwrecks in the Philippine Sea
Japanese submarines lost during World War II
Submarines sunk by United States warships
Ships lost with all hands